Arthur Clarence Jones was a college football player.

University of Georgia
A native of Columbus, Jones was a prominent running back for the Georgia Bulldogs football team of the University of Georgia. In 1897, he was on the team during the season in which Richard Von Albade Gammon died. He was a renowned punter; a skill which had him moved to fullback by 1898. In this capacity Jones was selected All-Southern by W. A. Lambeth. Georgia beat Vanderbilt for the first time in '98. Jones was captain-elect for the '99 season.

References

American football halfbacks
American football fullbacks
American football punters
Georgia Bulldogs football players
All-Southern college football players
Players of American football from Columbus, Georgia